The Marinduque Provincial Board is the Sangguniang Panlalawigan (provincial legislature) of the Philippine province of Marinduque.

The members are elected via plurality-at-large voting: the province is divided into two districts, each having four seats. A voter votes up to four names, with the top four candidates per district being elected. The vice governor is the ex officio presiding officer, and only votes to break ties. The vice governor is elected via the plurality voting system province-wide.

The districts used in appropriation of members is not coextensive with the legislative district of Marinduque. Unlike congressional representation which is at-large, Marinduque is divided into two districts for representation in the Sangguniang Panlalawigan, with the western half of the province (Mogpog, Boac and Gasan) constituting the body's first district, and the eastern half (Santa Cruz, Torrijos and Buenavista) forming the second district.

Aside from the regular members, the board also includes the provincial federation presidents of the Liga ng mga Barangay (ABC, from its old name "Association of Barangay Captains"), the Sangguniang Kabataan (SK, youth councils) and the Philippine Councilors League (PCL).

Apportionment

List of members

Current members 
These are the members after the 2022 local elections and 2018 barangay and SK elections:

 Vice Governor: Adeline Marciano-Angeles (PDP–Laban)

References 

Politics of Marinduque
Provincial boards in the Philippines